K. N. Srivastava is an official of the Indian Administrative Service.  He served as the director general of the Archaeological Survey of India from January 2009 to January 2010. Prior to that, he was the Joint Secretary in the Ministry of Civil Aviation.

References 

Living people
Indian Administrative Service officers
1954 births